Paulo Morais (born 10 August 1974) is a Portuguese retired footballer.

References

1974 births
Living people
Portuguese footballers
Association football goalkeepers
G.D. Estoril Praia players
C.D. Beja players
S.C. Braga players
S.C. Campomaiorense players
F.C. Marco players
G.D. Peniche players
F.C. Oliveira do Hospital players